Jacob Kulick (born April 11, 1992), also known as KULICK, is an American recording artist, singer, songwriter, multi-instrumentalist, record producer, and audio engineer. He released his debut EP as KULICK, entitled Hydroplane on November 16, 2018. The EP includes the single releases "Ghost," "Colors," and "Hole in My Head." On October 16th, 2020 KULICK released his 9 track debut album titled "Yelling in a Quiet Neighborhood."

Early life 
Jacob grew up in West Penn Township, Pennsylvania with his two brothers, John and Joel Kulick, and parents John Kulick Jr. and Pamela Erbe. He attended school in Tamaqua, Pennsylvania, and started writing songs at the age of 12 as an outlet for bullying and anxiety. Jacob learned many instruments while growing up, teaching himself how to play. Between the ages of 13 and 16, he taught himself how to track and mix his own music, and fell in love with the songwriting process.

Career

2008–2011

Story of Another / For My Sanity 
In 2008, he started a band in high school called "Story of Another." They started playing covers and incorporating originals in their set list as well. The band played many bar shows as well as charity events. Jacob also self-recorded a 15-song album of his own originals in 2009 entitled For My Sanity. He sold the album on CDs to his classmates. Once graduating high school in 2010, the band members went to college, and the band was no longer active.

2012–2014

Runaway / Truth and Liars 

Jacob went to college at the Art Institute of Philadelphia to obtain his BS in audio engineering. He started playing his own songs as a solo act and got his start playing shows by winning an online competition to open for YouTube sensation Tyler Ward in 2012. He continued to play venues around Philadelphia for the next few years.

In 2013, he self-recorded a short acoustic rock EP titled Runaway. He performed the single "Runaway" and a cover of The Killers "Mr. Brightside" live on Radio 104.5 WRFF shortly after releasing the EP. In 2014, he released his next self-recorded and produced studio album Truth and Liars independently under his full name "Jacob Kulick." Jacob shot his first music video for his single "Truth and Liars" in August 2013.

2015–2017

High in Limbo 
In 2015, a 9-song EP High in Limbo was released and made available via Spotify and iTunes. Shortly after this release, Jacob started working at CBS Radio in New York City. It was there that he met someone who connected him with RCA Records Executive Joe Riccitelli. Jacob met with Joe Riccitelli for the first time in September 2015, playing him songs from High in Limbo.

PRJ001 
Over the next two years, Kulick wrote over 100 songs, showing his progress to RCA on a monthly basis. In 2016, he decided to start fresh with a new logo and a new stage name, slimmed down from "Jacob Kulick" to "Kulick." In 2017, Kulick started releasing songs that he wrote from the past two years, titling the collection "PRJ001." In January 2017, he released singles "Entropath", "Goner", and "Last Call."

"H" 
On February 1, 2017, Kulick released a special project entitled "H", which included a documentary and song. The project is about the heroin epidemic happening in his hometown of Tamaqua, Pennsylvania. The song is a poem that was written by Alexandria Sienkiewicz two months before her accidental overdose.

The song and documentary created online traction, reaching over 22,000 people on Facebook alone. It received coverage from multiple radio stations and local television. This created some traction for Kulick with RCA as well.

RCA Records 
In July 2017, KULICK signed with RCA / Gold N' Retriever Records. He also signed a publishing deal with Sony ATV. It is at this time that he used Keith Gensure (drummer) and Jerome Betz (bass player) (formerly members of Story of Another) to form a band to play his songs. He also began using Bugge Productions for KULICK's photo/video needs at this time.

2018–2019

"Ghost" 
KULICK released his first single "Ghost" along with a music video on April 27, 2018. The song entered at number 33 on the Billboard Mainstream Rock in July. This release was also the start of KULICK's first nationwide radio promo tour. On October 27, 2018, KULICK performed the single, along with a few other songs at 94.5FM's Buzzfest, sharing the stage with A Perfect Circle, Chevelle, Dirty Heads, Mike Shinoda, Puddle of Mudd, Scott Stapp, The Struts, The Nixons, Badflower, Grandson, and more.

"Colors" 
KULICK released his second single "Colors" along with a music video on October 29, 2018.

"Hole in My Head" 
KULICK released his third single "Hole in My Head" along with a music video on November 15, 2018.

Hydroplane EP 
KULICK released his first EP with RCA Records on November 16, 2018, entitled Hydroplane. The body of work received over 1,000,000 streams within six months of its release on Spotify.

The EP included the following tracks:
 "Ghost"
 "Hole in My Head"
 "City"
 "Colors"
 "Hydroplane"

"Scatterbrain" 
KULICK released "Scatterbrain," a song co-written with April Rose Gabrielli on March 28, 2019.

"Yelling in a Quiet Neighborhood" 
KULICK released his debut album "Yelling in a Quiet Neighborhood" on October 16th, 2020. The album consist of 9 songs, including the singles "Rope," "Talking To The Ceiling," "The Way I Am," and "Just Be Friends."

Tour and live shows 
In June 2018, KULICK went on his first tour with Sleeping With Sirens and The Rocket Summer as an acoustic opener. This was their first nationwide tour, consisting of playing 500–1000 cap rooms across the United States from July 7 to August 9. On October 27, 2018, the band performed at 94.5FM's Buzzfest, a radio festival in Houston, Texas. In November 2018, KULICK went on his first headline tour, hitting some major cities like New York City, Philadelphia, Pennsylvania, and Scranton, Pennsylvania. The eight day tour went on from November 26 to December 3.

Kulick went on a US/Canada tour in April–May 2019, supporting Andy Black and The Faim. After this tour, they played shows, opening for New Politics, Third Eye Blind, and Jimmy Eat World.

Personal life 
In 2013, Jacob and his high school sweetheart, Samantha, got engaged while living together in Philadelphia. They married in the Fall of 2016. They divorced in early 2020.

Discography

As Jacob Kulick 
 "For My Sanity" (2009)
 Runaway EP (2013)
 Truth and Liars EP (2014)
 High in Limbo (2015)
 "Entropath" (Single) (2017)
 "Goner" (Single) (2017)
 "Last Call" (Single) (2017)
 "H" (Single) (2017)

As Kulick 
 "Ghost" (Single) No. 33 US Hot Mainstream Rock Tracks (2018)
 "Colors" (Single) (2018)
 "Hole in My Head" (Single) (2018)
 Hydroplane (EP) (2018)
 "Scatterbrain" (Single) (2019)

References

External links 
 Official Website

1992 births
Living people
American pop musicians
RCA Records artists
American rock musicians
American people of French-Canadian descent
American people of German descent
People from Tamaqua, Pennsylvania